This is a list of notable events in music that took place in the year 1734.

Events
March 29 – Louis-Gabriel Guillemain becomes first violinist at the Royal Academy in Dijon.
April 23 – Johann Sebastian Bach gives the Leipzig première of Gottfried Heinrich Stölzel's Passion Oratorio Ein Lämmlein geht und trägt die Schuld at St. Thomas Church, Leipzig.
The subscription company called the Royal Academy of Music is wound up as a result of difficulties including arguments between Handel and his singers.
Approximate date of the William Dixon manuscript of music for the Border pipes.

Classical music

Carl Philipp Emanuel Bach – Harpsichord Concerto in E-flat major, H.404
Johann Michael Bach – Fürchtet euch nicht
Johann Sebastian Bach – 3 Choräle zu Trauungen, BWV 250–252
 Antonio Caldara – Il giuoco del quadriglio
Christoph Graupner 
Ouverture in G major, GWV 466
Tut Busse und lasse sich ein jeglicher, GWV 1104/34
Herr, die Wasserströme erheben sich, GWV 1115/34
George Frideric Handel – Antiphons, HWV 269–274
Johann Adolf Hasse – Il cantico de' tre fanciulli
Giovanni Battista Martini – 
Johann Joachim Quantz – 6 Flute Sonatas, RISM Q.19
Georg Reutter – La Betulia liberata
Georg Philipp Telemann 
6 Concerts et 6 Suites
Pyrmonter Kurwoche
12 Solos à violon ou traversiere avec la basse chiffrée
 Antonio Vivaldi 
Violin Concerto in C major, RV 177
Vengo a voi, luci adorate, RV 682

Opera
Francesco Araia – La forza dell'amore e dell'odio
Riccardo Broschi – Artaserse (collaboration with Hasse, Ariosti)
Antonio Caldara
La Clemenza di Tito
Le Lodi d'Augusto
Giovanni Battista Costanzi – La Flora
Geminiano Giacomelli – Merope
George Frideric Handel 
Il pastor fido, HWV 8b/c (revised from the 1712 version)
Arianna in Creta, HWV 32 (premiered)
Ariodante, HWV 33
Parnasso in festa, HWV 73 (Serenade)
 Johann Adolf Hasse – Larinda e Vanesio (intermezzo)
Giovanni Battista Pergolesi – Adriano in Siria
Antonio Vivaldi – L'Olimpiade
Various – Siface (inc. work from Giuseppe Sellitto, Nicola Antonio Porpora, Leonardo Vinci, Geminiano Giacomelli, Johann Adolph Hasse)

Publications 

 Johann Sebastian Bach – 149 Chorales, D-LEb Peters Ms. R 18
Joseph Bodin de Boismortier 
6 Sonates dont la derniere est en trio, Op. 50
6 Sonatas for Flute and Violin, Op. 51
4 Balets de village en trio, Op. 52
Michel Corrette – Premier Livre de Pièces pour le Clavecin, Op. 12
Jean-François Dandrieu – Pieces de clavecin, Book 3
Pierre Février – Pièces de clavecin, Livre 1
 George Frideric Handel – Op. 3, 6 concerti grossi (London: John Walsh)
Jean-Marie Leclair – 12 Violin Sonatas, Op. 5
Johann Melchior Molter – Sonata grossa in D major, MWV 4.5
Jean-Joseph Cassanéa de Mondonville – 6 Trio Sonatas, Op. 2
Jean-Baptiste Morin – La chasse du cerf
Giovanni Battista Somis – 12 Violin Sonatas, Op. 6
 Giuseppe Tartini – Violin Sonatas, Op. 1
Georg Philipp Telemann – Verzeichniß der Telemannischen Musikalischen Werke
 Carlo Tessarini – Il maestro e discepolo, Op. 2

Births
January 17 – François-Joseph Gossec (died 1829) 
February 20 – Franz Ignaz Beck (died 1809)
March 18 – Joseph Schmitt (died 1791)
April 19 – Karl von Ordoñez, composer (died 1786)
May 28 – Christoph Sonnleithner (died 1786)
June 19 – Alphonse du Congé Dubreuil (died 1801)
June 28 – Jean-Jacques Beauvarlet-Charpentier, organist and composer (died 1794)
July 15 – Johann Ernst Altenburg (died 1801)
July 20 – Jean-Henri Naderman (died 1799)
July 23 – Antonio Maria Gaspare Sacchini, composer (died 1786)
August 16 – Jean-Baptiste-Louis-Théodore de Tschudi (died 1784) 
September 5 – Jean-Benjamin de Laborde (died 1794)
September 25 – Louis-René-Édouard de Rohan (died 1803) 
December 18 – Jean-Baptiste Rey, conductor and composer (died 1810)
December 27 – Stephen Paxton (died 1787)
December 31 – Claude Joseph Dorat (died 1780)
date unknown – Benjamin Cooke, organist, composer and teacher (died 1793)

Deaths
February 25 – Marianna Bulgarelli, operatic soprano (born c. 1684)  
April 1 – Louis Lully (born 1664)
April 30 – Grzegorz Gerwazy Gorczycki (born c. 1665)
May 24 – Georg Ernst Stahl (born 1659)
June 13 – Nicolaus Vetter, organist and composer (born 1666)
October 6 – Gottfried Reiche, trumpet player and composer (born 1667)
date unknown – Obadiah Shuttleworth, violinist, organist and composer 

 
18th century in music
Music by year